My Lucky Star is a 1938 romantic comedy film. This was Norwegian ice-skating Olympic champion Sonja Henie's fourth film.

Plot
George Cabot Jr. (Cesar Romero), the son of a department store owner, enrolls the store's sports clerk Krista Nielsen (Sonja Henie) at a university to use her as an advertisement for their fashion department.

George is trying to pay off cabaret singer Marcelle La Verne, who wants to annul their brief elopement. Marcelle threatens to name Krista as a co-respondent in her lawsuit. Krista has fallen for Larry Taylor at the college, where a skating exhibition lands her on the cover of Life magazine.

Cast
 Sonja Henie as Krista Nielsen  
 Richard Greene as Larry Taylor  
 Joan Davis as Mary Dwight  
 Cesar Romero as George Cabot Jr  
 Buddy Ebsen as Buddy  
 Arthur Treacher as Whipple  
 George Barbier as George Cabot Sr  
 Gypsy Rose Lee as Marcelle La Verne (as Louise Hovick)  
 Billy Gilbert as Nick  
 Patricia Wilder as Dorothy  
 Paul Hurst as Louie  
 Elisha Cook Jr. as Waldo  
 Robert Kellard as Pennell  
 Gloria Brewster as June (as The Brewster Twins)  
 Barbara Brewster as Jean (as The Brewster Twins)

Production
The film was originally called They Met in College and started in April 1938. In March Richard Greene was signed to be her leading man.

Rehearsals started in April with over 300 ballet skaters. Buddy Ebsen was borrowed from MGM.

In April the title was changed to My Lucky Star.

20th Century Fox found this the easiest of Henie's films to make to date. s o

The film went six days over schedule.

Reception
Filmink summarized it as having a "Silly story. Poor male lead – Greene acts  like an army officer doing amateur theatricals. Great skating."

References

External links
 
 
My Lucky Star at Letterbox DVD
My Lucky Star at BFI
 
 

American romantic comedy films
1938 romantic comedy films
Films produced by Darryl F. Zanuck
Films directed by Roy Del Ruth
Figure skating films
Films scored by Louis Silvers
20th Century Fox films
American black-and-white films
1938 films
1930s English-language films
1930s American films